Pipil may refer to:
Nahua people of western El Salvador
Pipil language (Nawat)
Pipil grammar
Pipil language (typological overview)